Voices in the Night is a compilation album released by UK neo-progressive band Twelfth Night in 2007.

Details
Voices in the Night is a 2-CD set of unreleased recordings from all the vocalists associated with Twelfth Night.

CD 1 is a collection of studio rarities including 3 tracks with Electra from the Twelfth Night Early Material album. a rare track from short time member Ian Lloyd Jones is followed by three from Geoff Mann and four by Andy Sears. The track with Axe is the only recording with him on vocals. The last vocalist, Maryn Watson, contributes four tracks.

CD2 is a live disc. The first two tracks are the lost encores from Geoff’s final Marquee show, which were captured on Live and Let Live but space did not allow them to be included. Tracks from Andy Sears and Martyn Watson follow before the one off version of “Love Song” with both Geoff and Andy singing.

Track listing
All songs written by Twelfth Night.

Studio

with Electra
Cunning Man
Abacus
Aspidistra

with Ian Lloyd-Jones
Late Night TV

with Geoff Mann
Human Being
Fact and Fiction
Art and Illusion

with Nigel 'Axe' Atkins
Don't Make Me Laugh

with Andy Sears
I Am
South of the Wind
White Glass
Piccadilly Square

with Martyn Watson
Turning
Happening
A Tiny Everything
Zootime

Live
with Geoff Mann
Art and Illusion
Aspidentropy
Not on the Map

with Andy Sears
Last Song
Blue Powder Monkey
Take a Look

with Martyn Watson
Phantoms on the Telephone
Happening
A Tiny Everything
Turning
Zootime
Love Song

Personnel
Brian Devoil – drums, percussion
Clive Mitten – bass on all tracks except disc one tracks 13-16, disc two tracks 7-12
Andy Revell – electric guitars
Rick Battersby – keyboards
with
Electra McLeod – vocals on disc one tracks 1-3
Ian Lloyd Jones – vocals on disc one track 4
Geoff Mann – vocals on disc one tracks 5-7, disc two tracks 1-3 and 12
Nigel 'Axe' Atkins – vocals on disc one track 8
Andy Sears – vocals on disc one tracks 9-12, disc two tracks 4-6 and 12
Martyn Watson – vocals on disc one tracks 13-16, disc two tracks 7-11, bass on disc one tracks 13-16, disc two tracks 7-12

Twelfth Night (band) albums
2007 compilation albums
2007 live albums